Tor Inge Smedås (born 25 August 1957) is a Norwegian footballer. He played in two matches for the Norway national football team from 1986 to 1987.

References

External links
 

1957 births
Living people
Norwegian footballers
Norway international footballers
Place of birth missing (living people)
Association footballers not categorized by position